The following is a list of episodes of the South Korean TV program Let's Eat Dinner Together.  (episode 164), the members and guests dined successfully with 298 families, including eight families abroad (three in Japan, three in Russia and four in Hawaii).

 – Mission success: Before 20:00 (KST), a family invites the cast / guest (if any) into the house for dinner.
 – Mission partially failed: Between 20:00 to 21:30, the cast / guest (if any) managed to have dinner with local resident/s in a convenience store.
 – Mission completely failed.

Episodes

2016

2017

Remark
On August 9, 2017, SHINee's Onew and Han Ye-ri completed the recording for this show somewhere in Seoul to promote their new drama Age of Youth 2, and the episode is just waiting for the airing time. However, due to Onew's controversy of sexual harassment on August 12, 2017 and the pressure from public after, he decided to leave the drama and the production team of this show decided to indefinitely postpone their episode's broadcast.

2018

2019

Remark
Jin Goo and Kim Byeong-ok completed the recording for this show in Hwigyeong-dong, Dongdaemun-gu, Seoul to promote their new drama Legal High, and the episode was set to be aired on February 13, 2019. However, due to Kim Byeong-ok's controversy of drink-driving on February 12, 2019, the production team of this show decided to cancel the broadcast of this episode and he subsequently stepped down from the drama.

2020

Notes

References

Lists of variety television series episodes
Lists of South Korean television series episodes